Waysted is the first extended play and second overall release by British band Waysted. It was released in 1984 and reached No. 73 on the UK Albums Chart. The EP was re-issued on CD as Waysted Plus in 2008, with six songs recorded live at the Kerrang! Weekend Festival, Caister, Great Yarmouth, UK on 14 October 1984.

Track listing
All songs written by Fin Muir and Pete Way.
Side one
 "Won't Get Out Alive" - 2:46
 "Price You Pay" - 5:49
 "Rock Steady" - 3:39

Side two
 "Hurt So Good" - 4:20
 "Cinderella Boys" - 8:17

Waysted Plus bonus tracks
"Ball and Chain" (live) - 4:30
"Won't Get Out Alive" (live) - 4:30
"Rock Steady" (live) - 3:47
"Love Loaded" (live) - 4:43
"The Price You Pay" (live) - 6:31
"Too Hot to Handle" (live) - 5:26

Personnel
Waysted
 Fin Muir - vocals
 Paul Chapman - guitar
 Neil Shepard - guitar
 Pete Way - bass guitar
 Andy Parker - drums

Production
Leo Lyons - producer, engineer

References

1984 debut EPs
Waysted albums
Music for Nations albums
Albums produced by Leo Lyons